Wabush Water Aerodrome  is adjacent to Wabush, Newfoundland and Labrador, Canada on Little Wabush Lake and is open from June until October.

See also
Wabush Airport

References

Registered aerodromes in Newfoundland and Labrador
Seaplane bases in Newfoundland and Labrador